Attawapiskat 91A is the main reserve of the Attawapiskat First Nation, near the mouth of the Attawapiskat River in Kenora District, Ontario, Canada.

References

External links
 Aboriginal Affairs and Northern Development Canada profile

Cree reserves in Ontario
Communities in Kenora District